Waiting for the Hearse (Esperando la carroza in Spanish) is a 1985 Argentine comedy film directed by Alejandro Doria. It is considered a cult film. It opened on 6 May 1985.

The story belongs to the criollo grotesque (costumbrismo) genre or black comedy. It's based on the play of the same name by Jacobo Langsner, premiered by the Comedia Nacional company in 1962. The film adaptation starred some great local stars from the theater world like Antonio Gasalla, China Zorrilla, Luis Brandoni and Betiana Blum. In the River Plate culture, it's considered to be a classic and its reruns on TV still draw large audiences. On April 2, 2009, 23 years after the original film's release, a sequel, Waiting for the Hearse 2, was released.

In a survey of the 100 greatest films of Argentine cinema carried out by the Museo del Cine Pablo Ducrós Hicken in 2000, the film reached the 12th position. In a new version of the survey organized in 2022 by the specialized magazines La vida útil, Taipei and La tierra quema, presented at the Mar del Plata International Film Festival, the film reached the 16th position. Also in 2022, the film was included in Spanish magazine Fotogramass list of the 20 best Argentine films of all time.

Background 
The film was an adaptation of the play Esperando la carroza (Waiting for the Hearse) by Romanian-Uruguayan Jacobo Langsner and its TV adaptation, broadcast as a part of a show called Alta Comedia by Channel 9 of Buenos Aires during the 1970s, starred China Zorrilla who would go on to play the main role on the big screen adaptation later on, Pepe Soriano, Raúl Rossi, Dora Baret, Alberto Argibay, Lita Soriano, Alicia Berdaxágar, Marta Gam and the special appearance of the Austrian actress and acting teacher Hedy Crilla (1898–1984) as Mamá Cora.

Author and director Alejandro Doria rewrote the script for it to include more lines for the Mamá Cora character, which had very few in both previous versions, among other modifications.

Plot 

Musicardi's octogenarian widow, Ana María de los Dolores Buscaroli, called Mamá Cora by everybody (Antonio Gasalla), has four children: Antonio (Luis Brandoni), Sergio (Juan Manuel Tenuta), Emilia (Lidia Catalano) and Jorge Musicardi (Julio De Grazia) with whom she lives and goes through financial troubles. This situation, plus lack of space and constant generational conflicts, makes Susana (Jorge's wife) ask desperately for the siblings-in-law to take their mother with any of them for a while.

Susana had a domestic problem with Mamá Cora. The first was preparing some mayonnaise and she went to nurse her daughter leaving the ingredients alone. Mamá Cora remembered an earlier conversation about caramel custard, and she thought that this concoction was to make some of it, so she innocently added sugar, milk and eggs, causing Susana's rage. Susana storms into Sergio's house, who's getting ready with his perfidious wife Elvira (China Zorrilla) and their daughter Matilde (Andrea Tenuta) to welcome, with the classic Sunday meal, newly rich Antonio (Luis Brandoni) and Nora, his wife (Betiana Blum), who ascended socially and economically in unclear circumstances during Argentina's last dictatorship. Mamá Cora's destiny is debated while lunch is burnt: Sunday ravioli and the tomato sauce made by Elvira. No one wants to take responsibility for the old lady with the women speaking out their opinions and the men trying to maintain respect for the name of their mother.

On her own, Mamá Cora, due to what happened with Susana, decides to go out and stop bothering everyone for some hours. She ends up in the house across Sergio's taking care, as a favor, of the son of Dominga (the neighbor). Nobody finds her and, considering the "disappearance" after the fight with the daughter-in-law, plus the news about a disfigured body of an old lady who committed suicide throwing herself under a train, the remorseful clan comes to the hastened conclusion that Mamá Cora has killed herself so she could stop causing trouble. After double-checking with the police thanks to Antonio's "contacts", the tragedy is informed to the distant relatives and the humble working class Emilia (sister of Jorge, Sergio and Antonio), who arrives with despair over the terrible news.

In the meantime, from Dominga's terrace, Mamá Cora watches people coming and going in and out from Sergio and Elvira's house. Years of troubles, resentment and intrigues come up between all of them while they prepare the service for Mamá Cora. Misunderstandings follow and family's awful truths surface. In the middle of her own vigil, Mamá Cora reappears leaving everybody astonished. The family reconsiders and values the presence of its elder member while she and her friends go to the other woman's service (the old lady who had committed suicide), a Hungarian woman whose body was sent to the Musicardi family by mistake. Susana laughs out loud in front of her disconcerted relatives; she mocks them and herself, because from now on nothing will be the same again.

Cast 

 Luis Brandoni as Antonio Musicardi
 China Zorrilla as Elvira Romero-Musicardi (Sergio's wife)
 Antonio Gasalla as Ana María de los Dolores Buscarolli-Musicardi (Mamá Cora)
 Betiana Blum as Nora (Antonio's wife)
 Julio de Grazia as Jorge Musicardi
 Mónica Villa as Susana (Jorge's wife)
 Juan Manuel Tenuta as Sergio Musicardi
 Andrea Tenuta as Matilde Musicardi (Sergio and Elvira's daughter)
 Darío Grandinetti as Cacho (Emilia's son)
 Cecilia Rossetto as Dominga
 Enrique Pinti as Felipe
 Lidia Catalano as Emilia Musicardi
 Clotilde Borella as Doña Elisa
 Juan Acosta as Peralta

Production 

The house where the action takes place is in the neighborhood Versalles in Buenos Aires, on Echenagucía St. It was restored and declared Cultural Heritage of the city of Buenos Aires.

Reception 
Waiting for the Hearse was initially not well received by critics upon its release, and it was a moderate success at the box office. It later became a cult classic in Argentine cinema, and - since the first decades after its release - it has been considered as a story that reflects a bitter satire of the Argentine idiosyncrasy, the reality in the late '70s and early 80's and the disregard for senior people, as well as the state of the post-dictatorship society.

The script won the Argentores Award (the award of the Argentine Authors' Union) and the Argentine Film Critics Association award for Best Adapted Screenplay.

Legacy 
As a cult classic, every year the film draws surprising levels of audiences when it is broadcast on TV, generally on Sundays, since the story takes place on a Sunday, and the dialogues have set catchphrases and expressions that have been incorporated to the everyday language of both Argentina and Uruguay.

Celebrating two decades from its opening, in 2005 the film's DVD was launched with backstage and deleted scenes, plus an interview with Doria.

The character of "Mamá Cora" was later played by Antonio Gasalla in many other TV shows, including his own.

Sequel 
The sequel, Waiting for the Hearse 2, was filmed in 2008 with a script that was written by Jacobo Langsner in 1986. The film was later released in 2009. It received very negative reviews and did poorly at the box office. The role of Jorge was taken by Roberto Carnaghi, due to Julio de Grazia's death in 1989.

Remakes and adaptations 
Among the different international adaptations, there is a Portuguese TV movie titled Querida mãe ("Beloved mom"), based on the movie.

An homonymous play was premiered in Madrid, with Spanish actors speaking with a rioplatense accent.

A Brazilian remake by Fox Filmes do Brasil and Globo Filmes was released in 2008, starring Ary Fontoura and titled A guerra dos Rocha (The war of the Rochas).

References

External links 

 

1985 films
Argentine comedy films
1985 comedy films
1980s Spanish-language films
Films shot in Buenos Aires
Films set in Buenos Aires
Films directed by Alejandro Doria
Argentine films based on plays